Cross Lanes Christian School is a private, Christian elementary and secondary school in Cross Lanes, West Virginia, United States.  The school, located on a 42-acre campus, is a ministry of Cross Lanes Bible Church.  The school has an enrollment of over 300 students in grades K-5 through grade 12.

History
After an extended period of planning, the school opened on September 4, 1973, with about 70 students ranging from kindergarten through grade five.

Dedication of the school took place on February 17, 1974. Sixth grade was added in September 1974. A grade was added each year until 1980, when Cross Lanes Christian School graduated its first class of seniors.

The first building was completed on the present campus in September 1975. There are now five operating buildings - four with classrooms and one gymnasium. The newest classroom building was completed in 1998 and houses an expanded library, a large multi-purpose room, a computer lab, and one classroom.

See also
 Education in West Virginia
 List of high schools in West Virginia

External links 
 Cross Lanes Christian School
 Cross Lanes Bible Church

References 

 West Virginia Christian Education Association List of Member Schools
  West Virginia Department of Education WV School Directory

Educational institutions established in 1973
Private high schools in West Virginia
Private elementary schools in West Virginia
Christian schools in West Virginia
Schools in Kanawha County, West Virginia
1973 establishments in West Virginia